Moder may refer to:
 Moder (river), a tributary of the Rhine, in France
 Moder (surname)

See also